Bolgione is a village in Tuscany, central Italy, in the comune of Siena, province of Siena. At the time of the 2001 census its population was 138.

Bolgione is about 5 km from Siena.

References 

Frazioni of Siena